Taraval is a surname. Notable people with the surname include:

 Guillaume Taraval (1701–1750), Franco-Swedish painter
 Hugues Taraval (1715–1785), French painter
 Sigismundo Taraval (1700–1763), Italian Jesuit missionary

Transportation
 Taraval Line